Eucalyptus terebra, commonly known as Balladonia gimlet, is a species of gimlet that is endemic to Western Australia. It has satiny or glossy bark on its fluted trunk, linear to narrow lance-shaped adult leaves, flower buds in groups of seven, yellowish flowers and conical to hemispherical fruit. It is one of the seven species of gimlet.

Description
Eucalyptus terebra is a mallet that typically grows to a height of  but does not form a lignotuber. It has smooth satiny or glossy, dark grey to orange, green-brown bark on its fluted trunk. Flowering occurs in November and the flowers are lemon yellow.

Taxonomy and naming
Eucalyptus terebra was first formmaly described in 1991 by Lawrie Johnson and Ken Hill in the journal Telopea from specimens they collected near Balladonia in 1983. The specific epithet (terebra) is a Latin word for the woodworking tool called a gimlet.

Distribution and habitat
Balladonia gimlet grows in flat areas in the southern part of the Goldfields-Esperance region in calcerous loam or sandy soils. It is found between Balladonia and Norseman in the Coolgardie, Nullarbor and Mallee biogeographic regions.

Conservation status
This eucalypt is classified as "not threatened" by the Western Australian Government Department of Parks and Wildlife.

See also
List of Eucalyptus species

References

terebra
Endemic flora of Western Australia
Myrtales of Australia
Eucalypts of Western Australia
Plants described in 1991
Taxa named by Lawrence Alexander Sidney Johnson
Taxa named by Ken Hill (botanist)